Bandırma Airport  is a military airbase and public airport located at Bandırma in the Balıkesir Province, Turkey.

Bandırma Airport is home to the 6th Air Wing (Ana Jet Üs or AJÜ) of the 1st Air Force Command (Hava Kuvvet Komutanligi) of the Turkish Air Force (Türk Hava Kuvvetleri). Other wings of this command are located in Eskişehir (LTBI), Konya (LTAN), Ankara Akıncı (LTAE) and Balıkesir (LTBF).

References

External links
 
 

Airports in Turkey
Turkish Air Force bases
Military in Balıkesir
Buildings and structures in Balıkesir Province
Bandırma
Transport in Balıkesir Province